Agrupación Deportiva Sagardía was a Spanish women's handball club from Santander, Cantabria, founded in 1984. It takes its name from the school in the city's Peñacastillo district where it was born in 1978. Nowadays it is settled in the La Albericia district. The club has also been known as Bansander, Verdaloe, Caja Cantabria and Marina Park for sponsorship reasons.

Sagardía has played seven seasons in the División de Honor from 1996 to 2011 with modest results, avoiding relegation in two occasions. In 2012 it registered in the third tier for financial reasons, subsequently earning promotion for the second category.

Season to season

References

Sport in Santander, Spain
Handball in Cantabria
Spanish handball clubs
Handball clubs established in 1984
Handball clubs disestablished in 2013
Sports teams in Cantabria
Defunct handball clubs
1984 establishments in Spain
2013 disestablishments in Spain